Events in the year 1938 in Brazil.

Incumbents

Federal government 
President: Getúlio Vargas

Governors 
 Alagoas: Osman Laurel
 Amazonas: Álvaro Botelho Maia 
 Bahia: Antônio Fernandes Dantas then Landulfo Alves
 Ceará: Francisco de Meneses Pimentel
 Espírito Santo: João Punaro Bley
 Goiás: Pedro Ludovico Teixeira
 Maranhão:
 Mato Grosso: Júlio Strübing Müller
 Minas Gerais: Benedito Valadares Ribeiro
 Pará: José Carneiro da Gama Malcher
 Paraíba: Argemiro de Figueiredo 
 Paraná: Manuel Ribas
 Pernambuco: Agamenon Magalhães
 Piauí: Leônidas Melo 
 Rio Grande do Norte: Rafael Fernandes Gurjão 
 Rio Grande do Sul: 
 till 19 January: Manuel de Cerqueira Daltro Filho 
 19 January-4 March: Joaquim Maurício Cardoso
 from 4 March: Osvaldo Cordeiro de Farias
 Santa Catarina: Nereu Ramos
 São Paulo: 
 till 25 April: José Joaquim Cardoso de Melo Neto
 25 April-27 April: Francisco José da Silva Júnior 
 from 27 April: Ademar de Barros
 Sergipe: Erônides de Carvalho

Vice governors 
 Rio Grande do Norte: no vice governor
 São Paulo: no vice governor

Events 
May – The Brazilian integralist movement attempt a coup d'état, supported by the Axis powers.  The failure of the "Pajama Putsch" leads to the dissolution of the AIB.
28 July – Folk hero Lampião and his band are ambushed in one of his hideouts, the Angicos farm, in the state of Sergipe.
date unknown
Michel Bernanos visits Brazil for the first time.
Mário de Andrade takes up a post at the Universidade Federal do Rio de Janeiro.

Arts and culture

Films 
Alma e Corpo de uma Raça
Aruanã
Maridinho de Luxo
Tererê Não Resolve

Births 
27 January – Raul Gil, television presenter and singer
 5 April – Marly Marley, actress and vedette (died 2014)
18 August – Orestes Quércia, politician (died 2010)
 6 June – Prince Luiz of Orléans-Braganza, pretender to the Brazilian throne
23 July – Menalton Braff, novelist and short story writer
25 July – Sérgio Ferro, painter
5 November – Enéas Carneiro, politician (died 2007)
25 November – Luiz Henrique Rosa, musician and soccer player (died 1985)

Deaths 
28 July
Lampião, bandit (born 1897; killed in a police ambush)
Maria Bonita, bandit (born 1911; killed along with her boyfriend Lampião)

References

See also 
1938 in Brazilian football
List of Brazilian films of 1938

 
1930s in Brazil
Years of the 20th century in Brazil
Brazil
Brazil